Nižná Hutka is a village and municipality in Košice-okolie District in the Kosice Region of eastern Slovakia. One of the two consulates of the Seychelles in Slovakia is located in Nižná Hutka.

History
In historical records, the village was first mentioned in 1293.

Geography
The village lies at an altitude of 214 metres and covers an area of 4.348 km².
It has a population of about 510 people. The Torysa River flows into the Hornád River near Nižná Hutka.

References

External links

Villages and municipalities in Košice-okolie District